Petoskey is a city in and the county seat of Emmet County, Michigan, United States. Part of Northern Michigan, Petoskey is a popular Midwestern resort town, as it sits on the shore of Little Traverse Bay, a bay of Lake Michigan. At the 2020 census, Petoskey's population was 5,877.

History

Odawa inhabitants
The Little Traverse Bay area was long inhabited by indigenous peoples, including the Odawa people. The name Petoskey is said to mean "where the light shines through the clouds" in the language of the Odawa. After the 1836 Treaty of Washington, Odawa Chief Ignatius Petosega (1787–1885) took the opportunity to purchase lands near the Bear River. Petosega's father was Antoine Carre, a French Canadian fur trader and his mother was Odawa.

Early Presbyterian missions
By the 1850s, several religious groups had established missions near the Little Traverse Bay. A Mormon offshoot had been based at Beaver Island, the Jesuit missionaries had been based at L'arbor Croche and Michilimackinac, with a Catholic presence in Harbor Springs, then known as "Little Traverse". Andrew Porter, a Presbyterian missionary, arrived at the village of Bear River (as it was then called) in 1852.

Pioneer commercial interests
Amos Fox and Hirem Obed Rose were pioneer entrepreneurs who had made money during both the California Gold Rush and at Northport selling lumber and goods to passing ships. Originally based at Northport, in the 1850s Rose and Fox (or Fox & Rose) expanded their business interests to Charlevoix and Petoskey. Rose also earned income as part of a business partnership that extended the railroad from Walton Junction to Traverse City. H.O. Rose, along with Archibald Buttars, established a general merchandise business in Petoskey.

After the partnership split, Rose relocated to Petoskey and in 1873 built the first dock in the town. When the Grand Rapids and Indiana Railroad was about to be extended into the Bay View area, Rose purchased much land in that area, as well as trolley cars, to enable transport between Petoskey and Bay View. Rose also developed the first general store, extensive lime quarries (Michigan Limestone Company, aka Petoskey Lime Company;), building the Arlington Hotel, and lumbering enterprises, and harbor improvements in 1893. He served as first president of the village and officiated at early commemorative public events. Rose's influence on the city was also commemorated by the naming of the H. O. Rose room at the Perry Hotel.

Passenger Pigeons 

In the late 19th century, Petoskey was in the region of Northern Michigan where 50,000 passenger pigeon birds were killed daily in massive hunts, leading to their complete extinction in the early 20th century. A state historical marker memorializes these events, including the last great nesting of the passenger pigeons at Crooked Lake in 1878. One hunter was reputed to have personally killed "a million birds" and earned $60,000, the equivalent of $1 million today.

Petoskey is noted for a high concentration of ancient fossil coral, now named Petoskey stones, designated as the state stone of Michigan.

This city was the northern terminus of the Chicago and West Michigan Railway.

With members descended from the numerous bands in northern Michigan, the Little Traverse Bay Band is a federally recognized tribe that has its headquarters at nearby Harbor Springs, Michigan. It also owns and operates a gaming casino in Petoskey.

Geography

Part of Northern Michigan, Petoskey is on the southeast shore of the Little Traverse Bay of Lake Michigan at the mouth of the Bear River.

Demographics

2010 census
As of the census of 2010, there were 5,670 people, 2,538 households, and 1,319 families residing in the city. The racial makeup of the city was 91.7% White, 0.7% African American, 4.7% Native American, 0.4% Asian, 0.5% from other races, and 2.1% from two or more races. Hispanic or Latino of any race were 1.9% of the population.

There were 2,538 households, of which 24.3% had children under the age of 18 living with them, 36.7% were married couples living together, 11.8% had a female householder with no husband present, 3.5% had a male householder with no wife present, and 48.0% were non-families. 39.2% of all households were made up of individuals, and 12.2% had someone living alone who was 65 years of age or older. The average household size was 2.10 and the average family size was 2.81.

The median age in the city was 39.8 years. 19.4% of residents were under the age of 18; 11.9% were between the ages of 18 and 24; 24.5% were from 25 to 44; 28.1% were from 45 to 64; and 16.1% were 65 years of age or older. The gender makeup of the city was 47.3% male and 52.7% female.

2000 census
As of the census of 2000, there were 6,080 people, 2,700 households, and 1,447 families residing in the city. The racial makeup of the city was 94.18% White, 0.33% African American, 3.17% Native American, 0.81% Asian, 0.02% Pacific Islander, 0.20% from other races, and 1.30% from two or more races. Hispanic or Latino of any race were 1.17% of the population.

There were 2,700 households, out of which 27.5% had children under the age of 18 living with them, 39.8% were married couples living together, 11.0% had a female householder with no husband present, and 46.4% were non-families. 39.4% of all households were made up of individuals, and 14.6% had someone living alone who was 65 years of age or older. The average household size was 2.14 and the average family size was 2.89.

In the city, the population was spread out, with 23.0% under the age of 18, 9.6% from 18 to 24, 28.5% from 25 to 44, 21.7% from 45 to 64, and 17.3% who were 65 years of age or older. The median age was 39 years. For every 100 females, there were 85.6 males. For every 100 females age 18 and over, there were 81.2 males.

The median income for a household in the city was $33,657, and the median income for a family was $48,168. Males had a median income of $35,875 versus $25,114 for females. The per capita income for the city was $20,259. About 6.6% of families and 12.0% of the population were below the poverty line, including 8.6% of those under age 18 and 8.4% of those age 65 or over.

Transportation

Airports
 The nearest airports with scheduled passenger service are in Pellston Regional Airport and Traverse City Cherry Capital Airport.

Bus
 Indian Trails provides daily intercity bus service between St. Ignace and East Lansing, Michigan and between Grand Rapids, Michigan and Petoskey. Transfer between the two lines is possible in Petoskey.
The EMGO/SRR bus service runs Monday through Friday, from Petoskey, Mackinaw City, Harbor Springs, and to multiple locations in Emmet County with flexible routes within many communities along the way.

Rail
 Freight rail service to Petoskey is limited and provided by the Tuscola and Saginaw Bay Railway (TSBY); however, the tracks are owned by the state of Michigan in order to preserve rail service in northern Michigan. Freight traffic includes plastic pellets delivered to a rail/truck transload facility for Petoskey Plastics. Occasional passenger/special excursion trains to Petoskey occur every now and then.

Historically, the Pennsylvania Railroad's Northern Arrow, the Pere Marquette Railway's Resort Special and other trains provided passenger traffic to Petoskey and Bay View, Michigan from as far as Chicago, St. Louis, Cincinnati and Detroit but these were discontinued in the late 20th century. The Pere Marquette trains (and later the Chesapeake and Ohio Railway) used its station, and the Pennsylvania Railroad its own separate station. The last Chesapeake and Ohio (successor to the Pere Marquette) trains were discontinued by 1963, thus ending scheduled passenger train service to Petoskey.

Marina
 The City of Petoskey Department of Parks and Recreation operates a 144-slip marina located in Bayfront Park. The marina offers seasonal and transient slips, gasoline, diesel fuel, boat launch, wireless internet, 30/50 AMP power, water, pump-out, restroom/showers, playground and adjacent park grounds. The Gaslight District is connected to Bayfront Park via a pedestrian tunnel. The marina received initial designation as a "Michigan Clean Marina" in May 2007 and was recertified in 2010.

Major highways
 is a major highway running through the heart of the city. It continues southerly toward Charlevoix, Traverse City and Muskegon and northerly to a terminus near Mackinaw City.
 has its northern terminus in the city and continues southerly toward Cadillac and Grand Rapids.
, accessible off US 31 east of the city and Bay View, continues around the north side of Little Traverse Bay to Harbor Springs and then to Cross Village.
 begins at C-81 just east of the city and continues to Wolverine.
 is a north–south route passing just to the east of the city.

Education
Among the many colleges in Michigan includes North Central Michigan College, located in Petoskey. The public school system consists of a high school, a middle school, and four elementary schools. Additionally, Petoskey Public Schools has a Montessori education building.

Notable people
 Megan Boone, actress, star of NBC series The Blacklist
 Katie Brown, television host
 Bruce Catton, U.S. Civil War historian
 Grace Chandler, photographer based in Petoskey
 Forest Evashevski, College football player and coach including national championship at University of Iowa football 
 Mark Farner, lead singer, lead guitarist of Grand Funk Railroad
 Alan Hewitt, musician and keyboardist for the Moody Blues, formerly worked with Earth, Wind and Fire
David Malpass, economist, government official, president of the World Bank Group
 Herb Orvis, NFL defensive tackle 1972–81, member of College Football Hall of Fame
 Claude Shannon, father of information theory
 Hal Smith, voice actor, Otis Campbell on The Andy Griffith Show
 Sufjan Stevens, singer-songwriter
 Famous Last Words (band), modern post hardcore band

Media

Newspaper
 Petoskey News-Review

Magazines
Traverse, is published monthly with a focus on regional interests.

Local AM radio
 WLDR (750) - country; simulcast of WLDR-FM Traverse City
 WJML (1110) - Talk
 WMKT (1270) - News/Talk (licensed to Charlevoix, studios in Petoskey)
 WMBN (1340) - Sports Talk Radio

Local FM radio
 WTLI (89.3) - contemporary Christian "Smile FM"
 WTCK (90.9) - Catholic religious (Charlevoix)
 WJOG (91.3) - contemporary Christian "Smile FM"
 WBCM (93.5) - country; simulcast of WTCM-FM Traverse City
 W237DA (95.3) - translator of WFDX-FM Atlanta (classic hits)
 WLXT (96.3) - adult contemporary
 WKLZ (98.9) - classic rock; simulcast of WKLT-FM Kalkaska
 W259AH (99.7) - translator of WPHN-FM Gaylord (religious)
 WICV (100.9) - classical (East Jordan); simulcast of WIAA-FM Interlochen
 WCMW (103.9) - CMU Public Radio (Harbor Springs)
 WKHQ (105.9) - CHR/top 40 (licensed to Charlevoix, studios in Petoskey)
 WLJD (107.9) - Christian (Charlevoix); simulcast of WLJN-FM

Climate
This climatic region has large seasonal temperature differences, with warm to hot (and often humid) summers and cold (sometimes severely cold) winters. According to the Köppen Climate Classification system, Petoskey has a humid continental climate, abbreviated "Dfb" on climate maps. Because of its proximity to Lake Michigan it has incredible seasonal lag, with August as the warmest month and February as the coldest month.

In popular culture

Petoskey and the surrounding area are notable in 20th-century U.S. literature as the setting of several of the Nick Adams stories written by Ernest Hemingway, who spent his childhood summers on nearby Walloon Lake. They are the setting for certain events in Jeffrey Eugenides' 2002 novel Middlesex, which also features Detroit and its suburban areas.  The movie, "Beside Still Waters", directed by co-screenwriter Chris Lowell, was filmed in Petoskey in 2012.

Christopher Wright, an author from Topinabee, wrote his novel "Bestseller" in 2002 under the pen name Christopher Knight.  Wright funded the movie project for his book to be filmed in Petoskey in 2013.  Wright also wrote the children's series "Michigan Chillers" and the series "American Chillers" under the pen name Johnathon Rand.

References

Further reading
Cappel, Constance, Hemingway in Michigan, 1999, Petoskey, MI: Little Traverse Historical Society
Cappel, Constance, ed., 2006 Odawa Language and Legends, Philadelphia, PA: Xlibris
Cappel, Constance, 2007, The Smallpox Genocide of the Odawa Tribe at L'Arbre Croche, 1763: A History of a Native American People, Lewiston, NY: Ediwin Mellen Press.
Clarke Historical Library, Central Michigan University, Bibliography on Emmet County.

External links

 
Petoskey Area Visitors Bureau
City of Petoskey Web Site - information, news, and events

Cities in Emmet County, Michigan
County seats in Michigan
Michigan populated places on Lake Michigan
Coastal resorts in Michigan
Superfund sites in Michigan
Populated places established in 1879
1879 establishments in Michigan